Macraes Mine in East Otago is New Zealand's largest gold mine, and consists of a large scale opencast mine opened in 1990, and a newer underground mine, opened in 2008. It is situated close to the settlement of Macraes Flat and is owned by OceanaGold Corporation.

Gold production averaged 193,000 Troy ounces/year for 2008 through 2010. Ore grades have been declining, to 1.26 grams/tonne in 2010, but recoveries have improved slightly to 81% of the gold contained in the ore, in 2010. From 1990 through 2014, gold production totaled about 4 million ounces. The mine's 5 millionth ounce was poured in July 2019. The company claims a gold reserve of 1.53 MM troy oz Au plus a larger subeconomic gold resource; and expects the mine to operate at least through 2021.  As of July 2019, over 5 million ounces of gold have been extracted.

The gold bearing rocks were formed by the orogenic processes that created the Otago Schist belt.

References

External links
 Macraes Mine at Oceana Gold

Buildings and structures in Otago
Gold mines in New Zealand
Open-pit mines
Surface mines in New Zealand